The Southeastern Conference (SEC) Women's Basketball Player of the Year is an award given to the most outstanding player in the Southeastern Conference.

Although the SEC began its women's postseason tournament in 1980, and began official regular-season conference play in the 1982–83 season, a Player of the Year award was not created until the 1986–87 season.

Currently, two bodies vote for Players of the Year. The league's coaches have selected a Player of the Year since the 1986–87 season, and the Associated Press began presenting its version of the award in the 1996–97 season. The two voting bodies have split their honors three times, most recently in 2012–13 when the AP honored A'dia Mathies of Kentucky and the coaches honored Meighan Simmons of Tennessee.

The school with the most SEC Player of the Year award winners is Tennessee, with 9 total awards. Four SEC members have yet to have a winner—charter SEC members Alabama and Ole Miss, and 2012 arrivals Missouri and Texas A&M.

While ten players have won at least a share of the award twice, only one, A'ja Wilson of South Carolina, has won three times.

Key

Winners

Winners by school

Footnotes
If no special demarcation indicates which award the player won that season, then she had earned all of the awards available for that year.

References
General
 List of winners through 2011–12 season:
 Winners of major national awards: 

Specific

Awards established in 1987
NCAA Division I women's basketball conference players of the year
Player